Topolovac is a village near Sisak, Croatia. 

The local football club is NK TŠK Topolovac.

Populated places in Sisak-Moslavina County